Gemma Fay (born 9 December 1981) is a Scottish former female international football goalkeeper and actress. She played in Iceland for Stjarnan. Fay made 203 appearances for the Scotland national team, becoming their most capped player.

Career
Fay made her senior Scotland debut against Czech Republic in May 1998 and Fay won 23 Scotland caps before the age of 19. She praised the contribution of her national goalkeeping coach, Jim Gallacher.

In 2009, Fay took over the captain's armband from long-term skipper Julie Fleeting and then reached 100 caps against Canada at the Cyprus Cup in 2009. In December 2011 Fay and three Celtic women's team mates were approached about playing for Team GB at the 2012 Olympics.

Fay moved on to 141 appearances in May 2012, equalling the record held by Pauline Hamill, after playing in a 3–1 friendly win over Poland in Gdańsk. She set a new record of 142 appearances after playing in Scotland's next match, a 4–1 friendly defeat to Sweden.

Fay lost her place in the Glasgow City team in 2017 to Lee Alexander.  In an effort to prolong her international career, Fay moved to Icelandic club Stjarnan in April 2017. She made her 200th full international appearance in July 2017, in a friendly against Ireland.

In November 2017, Fay was appointed as Scottish Rugby's new Head of Women and Girls' rugby.

Fay was part of the BBC's coverage of the 2019 FIFA Women's World Cup.

Acting

In 2013, Gemma made her TV acting debut in the one-off Sky Living drama Rubenesque.

See also
List of women's footballers with 100 or more caps
 Scottish FA Women's International Roll of Honour

References

External links
 
 
 
 
 

Living people
1981 births
Scottish women's footballers
Footballers from Perth, Scotland
Women's association football goalkeepers
Scotland women's international footballers
FIFA Century Club
FA Women's National League players
Gemma Fay
Aberdeen F.C. Women players
Brighton & Hove Albion W.F.C. players
Hibernian W.F.C. players
Leeds United Women F.C. players
Celtic F.C. Women players
Glasgow City F.C. players
Stjarnan women's football players
Scottish expatriate women's footballers
Scottish expatriate sportspeople in Iceland
Expatriate women's footballers in Iceland
UEFA Women's Euro 2017 players